The Redonda skink (Copeoglossum redondae) was a species of skink found on Redonda in Antigua and Barbuda, and Barbados. It is now considered extinct.

References

Copeoglossum
Reptiles described in 2012
Reptiles of Antigua and Barbuda
Endemic fauna of Antigua and Barbuda
Taxa named by Stephen Blair Hedges
Taxa named by Caitlin E. Conn
Lizards of the Caribbean
Redonda